Petruccio is the primary male character in William Shakespeare's The Taming of the Shrew.

Petruccio or Petruchio may also refer to:

People
 Petruccio Ubaldini (16th century), Italian calligraphist and illuminator
 Petruccio de Migliolo (died 1486), a Roman Catholic prelate
 Pietro Montanini (1619–1689), also called Petruccio Perugino, an Italian painter of the Baroque period
 Pietro Farnese, also called Petruccio di Cola (c. 1310–1363), an Italian military leader
 Petrúcio Ferreira dos Santos (born 1996), a Paralympic sprinter from Brazil

Other uses
 Petruccio, opera by Alick Maclean (1872–1936)
 Petruccio, character in Palatsi (opera) by Aulis Sallinen (1995)
 Petruccio, character in The Queen and Concubine, a play published in 1659
 Petruchio (Romeo and Juliet), unseen character in William Shakespeare's Romeo and Juliet

See also
Petrucci (disambiguation)